Mood II Swing was an American house music production duo, consisting of producers John Ciafone and Lem Springsteen, based in New York City.

Discography

Singles
1996 "Do It Your Way"
2000 "Call Me"
2010 "Move Me"

Remixes
 1994 Karen Finley - "Lick It" ('No Afro Sheen' mix)
 1995 Janet Jackson - "Come On Get Up"
 1996 Lucy Pearl - "Don't Mess With My Man"
 1997 Ultra Naté - wrote & produced "Free"

References

American house music duos
DJs from New York City
Electronic dance music duos
Record production duos
Remixers
Progressive house musicians
Musical groups established in 1992